Glasgow Kelvin College is a further education college in Glasgow, Scotland, which was formed 1 November 2013 from the merger of John Wheatley College, Stow College and North Glasgow College. The college is named after the scientist Lord Kelvin as a statement of its intent to promote engineering and scientific education programmes.

There are five main campuses in the North East of the city and a community based learning network of around 26 centres supported by the college. The college was officially opened on Monday 4 November 2013 by Michael Russell, MSP, Cabinet Secretary for Education and Lifelong Learning. The Strategic Plan for 2014/17 is available on the college website.

The college is assigned to the Glasgow Colleges' Regional Board(GCRB) which is the regional strategic body charged with overseeing FE in Glasgow.

The Principal is Alan Sherry who was previously Principal at John Wheatley College. The Chair is Irving Hodgson who served on the North Glasgow Board prior to the merger. The college is seeking to promote Excellence, Progression and Enterprise through its curriculum.  To support this work the college is the only Scottish member of the Gazelle College Group.  This is a UK wide college grouping which seeks to promote innovative approaches to learning and teaching. This is supported within the college by the Empowered to Take Action programme.

At the Glasgow 2014 Commonwealth Games the college won the contract to provide the alterations for all the volunteers, medal bearers and officials.  Sound engineering students worked with the BBC to run a pop radio station broadcasting to the Commonwealth during the period of the Games.

The college won the UK Beacon Award for widening access to FE/HE for 16- to 19-year-olds in 2013. In 2014 learners at the college swept the Board at the ScotGem Awards winning all three top prizes. Learners were also successful in a number of other events including the Trades House of Glasgow annual awards, apprenticeship competitions in a number of construction craft areas and national photography competitions. Learners have won many awards in a variety of Building Engineering Services vocational areas including Heating and Ventilation. A college student was the first woman to win the UK Heating & Ventilation apprentice of the year in 2015.

In December 2015 the college signed a partnership agreement with BEST the sector skills body for Building and Engineering Services.

The Board has approved a STEM Manifesto which sets out its ambition for developing this important curricular area. The college was awarded STEM Assured Status by NEF: The Innovation Institute in December 2015.

The college has developed Community Achievement Awards to recognise the learning undertaken by students in community based settings.  These awards are accredited within the SCQF framework and support the Statement of Ambition for Adult Learning.

The college has also signed a partnership with the Wheatley Group, expanding its community based learning network.  The network is now known as the John Wheatley Learning Network in honour of John Wheatley (1869 – 1930)the former Shettleston MP and Minister for Housing in the first Labour Government. This network has expanded to other parts of the city as the demand for the college's approach to community-based learning increases.

As part of the college commitment to Lifelong Learning it is a partner with the Blue Triangle Housing Association to provide learning for their service users.

As member of the Glasgow Colleges' Group the college is working with its two sister colleges in the city (City of Glasgow College and Glasgow Clyde College) to develop a 21st Century curriculum for Glasgow. Part of this curriculum approach will reduce the size of the college and include the closure of the former Stow College building in Shamrock Street.

Staff from the college play an active role in developing and supporting the work of the North East Glasgow Community Planning Partnership particularly in the areas of Lifelong Learning and Youth Work.

The college offers an innovative Transitions to Learning and Work programme for care experienced young people which has received national recognition including from Buttle UK.

The college is developing partnerships in India working with community colleges in that country to exchange learning experiences and develop teaching materials.

Glasgow Kelvin College was runner up the college football cup in season 2014/15.

The college is a sponsor of Glasgow Rocks professional basketball and collaborates with that organisation to promoted positive approaches to active lifestyles in North East Glasgow.

References

External links

Further education colleges in Glasgow
Educational institutions established in 2013
2013 establishments in Scotland